Dumitru Popescu (born 11 April 1994, Chișinău, Moldova) is a Moldavian football forward who plays for Dinamo-Auto Tiraspol.

Club statistics
Total matches played in Moldavian First League: 28 matches - 0 goals
Total matches in Moldavian Cup: ! matches- 1 goal

References

External links

Profile at FC Dacia Chișinău

1994 births
Footballers from Chișinău
Moldovan footballers
Living people
FC Dacia Chișinău players
Association football forwards